William J. Gantter (June 15, 1885 - February 25, 1942) was a member of the Wisconsin State Assembly.

Biography
Gantter was born on June 15, 1885, in Kaukauna, Wisconsin. During World War I, he served in the United States Army. In 1937, Gantter was Police Commissioner and Fire Commissioner of Kaukauna.

Political career
Gantter was a member of the Assembly from 1939 to 1940. He was a Republican. Afterward, he became the mayor of Kaukana. His term as mayor was cut short by his death, on February 25, 1942.

References

People from Kaukauna, Wisconsin
Republican Party members of the Wisconsin State Assembly
Military personnel from Wisconsin
United States Army soldiers
United States Army personnel of World War I
1885 births
1942 deaths
Mayors of places in Wisconsin